Henry Blake may refer to:

 Sir Henry Arthur Blake (1840–1918), British colonial administrator and Governor of Hong Kong
 Henry Blake (baseball) (1874–1919), American baseball player
 Henry Blake (lighthouse keeper) (1837–1871), American lighthouse keeper
 Sir Henry Charles Blake, 4th Baronet (1794–1880), of the Blake baronets
 Henry N. Blake (1838–1935), first chief justice of the Montana Supreme Court after statehood

Fictional characters
 Henry Blake (M*A*S*H), a character in the television series M*A*S*H

See also

Harry Blake (disambiguation)